Pensioner Settlements was a 19th-century parliamentary multi-member electorate in the Auckland region of New Zealand, from 1853 to 1870.

Geographic distribution

The electorate was in South Auckland, based on the settlements or suburbs of Howick, Onehunga, Otahuhu, and Panmure where the Fencibles lived; retired former British soldiers who were available to defend Auckland during the New Zealand Wars.

History

Pensioner Settlements was one of the original electorates used for the 1st Parliament elected in 1853; and existed until the end of the 4th Parliament on 30 December 1870. In 1871, several new electorates were created in Auckland.

Captain Symonds was elected on 30 April 1858. De Quincey was elected in the 1866 general election, but he resigned soon after. The 5 August 1867 by-election was won by John Kerr. A second person, a Mr Jackson, was nominated, but the returning officer would not accept the nomination, as Jackson was not on the electoral roll. Thus, Kerr was declared elected unopposed.

Members of Parliament
The electorate was represented by seven Members of Parliament. From 1853 to 1860, it was a two-member electorate. For the 3rd and 4th Parliaments, it was a single-member electorate.

Key

multi-member electorate

single-member electorate

Election results

1858 by-election

References

Historical electorates of New Zealand
1853 establishments in New Zealand
1870 disestablishments in New Zealand